The Atlas of the British Flora is a book by Franklyn Perring and S. Max Walters, published by the Botanical Society of the British Isles.

It was first published in 1962, with a second edition published in 1976, and a third in 1982.

The atlas contains 10-km square distribution maps for all non-critical native and frequently occurring alien vascular plant species found in Britain and Ireland.

Importance 
The 1962 Atlas was a groundbreaking publication that revolutionized the study of natural history by introducing a scientific approach to observation. This approach, which was initially developed for national purposes, has since been adopted on an international scale and is now widely used in biological recording programs. In recent decades, advances in technology such as affordable personal computers, civilian GPS, and the internet have greatly enhanced the ability to record and share biological records. This has led to a significant increase in the accuracy and precision of these records, as well as the speed with which they can be shared online. As a result, the volume of available records has increased tenfold and they are now routinely used for research, conservation, and public policy purposes.

Over the past 50 years, rapid industrialization and urbanization have led to significant environmental changes, with plants often bearing the brunt of these changes in intensively managed landscapes. Even in remote areas, the effects of air pollution and climate change are becoming increasingly evident. The 1962 Atlas is one of the few existing biological baselines that can be used to measure these changes, and it has played a critical role in documenting and understanding the main drivers of change. While research into these processes is still in its early stages, the increase in data quality and improvements in data analysis methods have made it possible to produce more accurate and powerful results.

Bibliography

References 

Botany books
Botany in Europe
Flora of Great Britain
British Flora
British books
1962 non-fiction books